Robert Kitridge Wicker (May 25, 1877 – January 22, 1955) was a professional baseball player who was a pitcher in the Major Leagues from 1901 to 1906. He would play for the St. Louis Cardinals, Chicago Cubs, and Cincinnati Reds.

Wicker started his professional career in 1900. With Dayton of the Interstate League, he went 21–9. He joined the Cardinals the following season. In early 1903, he was traded to the Cubs, where he won 20 games for the only time in the majors.

Wicker continued to pitch well for the next two years. However, he started off slow in 1906 and was traded to the Reds, thus missing out on the Cubs' pennant win. Wicker then pitched in the minor leagues from 1907 to 1909 before retiring.

References

External links

1870s births
1955 deaths
Major League Baseball pitchers
Baseball players from Indiana
St. Louis Cardinals players
Chicago Cubs players
Cincinnati Reds players
Dayton Veterans players
Columbus Senators players
Mattoon Indians players
Montreal Royals players
Spokane Indians managers
Spokane Indians players
Sportspeople from Evanston, Illinois
Indiana Hoosiers baseball coaches